James E. Hinton (sometimes credited as Jim Hinton) was an American filmmaker and photographer. He was known as a documentarian of the civil rights movement; he worked on more than 70 documentaries as a cinematographer and director; but, Hinton is most especially known for his groundbreaking cinematography on the cult film Ganja & Hess. He founded his own production company—James E. Hinton Enterprises—in 1971. He directed and lensed a number of commercial, industrial, and educational films; a set of films for the National Endowment for the Arts; a set of films for the U.S. Department of Labor; and TV documentaries.

Select filmography 

 Identity Crisis (1989) (cinematographer, co-producer)
 Greased Lightning (1977) (associate producer)
 Ganja & Hess (1973) (cinematographer)
 Don't Play Us Cheap (1973) (second unit director)

References

External links

Stuart A. Rose Manuscript, Archives, and Rare Book Library, Emory University: James E. Hinton photographs and papers, 1954-2006

People from Atlantic City, New Jersey
Howard University alumni
African-American directors
African-American cinematographers
American cinematographers
1936 births
2006 deaths
20th-century African-American people
21st-century African-American people